Daan Ferman (16 April 1909 – 23 February 1969) was a Dutch rower. He competed in the men's eight event at the 1928 Summer Olympics.

References

1909 births
1969 deaths
Dutch male rowers
Olympic rowers of the Netherlands
Rowers at the 1928 Summer Olympics